Ricky Ann Lauren (née Loew-Beer; born June 15, 1943), is an American author, artist and photographer, and wife of fashion designer Ralph Lauren. She is also a psychotherapist.

Early life

Born Ricky Ann Loew-Beer, she grew up in New York City. She is the daughter of Austrian immigrants, Margaret Vytouch and Rudolph Loew-Beer. Lauren was an English major at Hunter College. She met her future husband Ralph Lauren at the eye doctor's office where she was working part time. Lauren taught fifth grade and danced for a time in The Bronx. On December 20, 1964, she married Ralph Lauren in New York City. She was the daughter of a Jewish father and a Catholic mother.

Career

Hostess, patron and fundraiser
Lauren has supported her husband's career as a kind of "silent partner", as summarized by The New York Times. These activities included attending fashion industry events or charities with him, hosting parties, and her patronage for charitable events. In 2000, she and her husband established a cancer center which is part of North General Hospital in Harlem. The couple also founded the Ralph and Ricky Lauren Center for the Performing Arts, which is located at the Lexington School for the Deaf, in New York City.

Lauren has been identified as the "Polo Persona", the model by which the Polo advertising campaigns are developed. Ralph identifies her as his muse, writing in his memoir: "I didn't like the girl with all the makeup and high heels. I liked the girl in jeans and a white shirt with rolled-up sleeves, wearing her boyfriend's jacket. That's the girl I am attracted to. That's the girl I married—Ricky." Ralph acknowledges that when he began designing women's clothes, his interest was piqued by his wife's frustration in finding clothes she would like that could fit her slim and petite build.

Psychotherapist
After her children were in school, Lauren returned to college, earned her degree, and then worked as a psychotherapist.

Author
Lauren is an author, artist and photographer best known for her lifestyle and cookbooks. One of her books is Cuisine, Lifestyle, and Legend of the Double RL Ranch, of which The New York Times says, "Here is a loving — and really beautiful — picture-book tribute (with history and recipes) to the spot near Telluride that spawned an empire built on denim shirts, tooled turquoise-buckle belts, and red-and-black horse blankets." It reflects her interest in a casual life style and simple Western-style cuisine. She wrote The Hamptons: Food, Family and History, which was well received by Publishers Weekly. Lauren wrote and illustrated "Safari" with her photographs from a 1983 trip to Africa. The proceeds of the leather-and canvas-bound book go to the World Wildlife Fund. She also wrote the book My Island in 1994.

Personal life
Ricky and Ralph Lauren have three children, Andrew, David, and  Dylan. The Laurens lived in Southampton, New York in a converted barn during the beginning of their marriage. Then, they spent the summers in Long Island. They had two houses in Amagansett, from which Ralph commuted into New York City, and then a house in East Hampton. She currently resides in New York City; Montauk, New York; Jamaica; and on the family owned Double RL Ranch beneath the San Juan Mountains outside Telluride, Colorado that they bought in 1982.

Lauren studied photography after she was married.

Notes

References

Further reading
 
 

American socialites
Living people
Lauren family
American food writers
1943 births
American people of Austrian descent
American people of Austrian-Jewish descent
American women non-fiction writers
Photographers from New York City
Writers from New York City
21st-century American women photographers
21st-century American photographers